Chicago Tonight is a television news program broadcast weeknights on WTTW in Chicago. It reports primarily on local politics, education, business, culture, science and health, with a mix of in-studio panel discussions, one-on-one interviews and short documentary-style packages. On its website, it publishes additional news stories and features by staff reporters.

The show first aired April 24, 1984 and was hosted by popular Chicago broadcast journalist John Callaway for 15 years, who continued to contribute to the show until his death in 2009.

Notable staff 
 Paris Schutz - host
 Brandis Friedman - host
 Phil Ponce – host
 Carol Marin – contributor

References

External links

Local news programming in the United States
1984 American television series debuts
1980s American television news shows
1990s American television news shows
2000s American television news shows
2010s American television news shows
2020s American television news shows
Television series by WTTW